Cline River is a locality in central Alberta, Canada within Clearwater County.

See also 
List of communities in Alberta

References 

Localities in Clearwater County, Alberta